Prairie Township, Illinois may refer to one of the following townships:

Homonyms
 Prairie Township, Crawford County, Illinois
 Prairie Township, Edgar County, Illinois
 Prairie Township, Hancock County, Illinois
 Prairie Township, Shelby County, Illinois

Include "Prairie" in the name

 Belle Prairie Township, Livingston County, Illinois
 Buffalo Prairie Township, Rock Island County, Illinois
 Burnt Prairie Township, White County, Illinois
 Elk Prairie Township, Jefferson County, Illinois
 Grand Prairie Township, Jefferson County, Illinois
 Heralds Prairie Township, White County, Illinois
 Indian Prairie Township, Wayne County, Illinois
 Knights Prairie Township, Hamilton County, Illinois
 La Prairie Township, Marshall County, Illinois
 Moore’s Prairie Township, Jefferson County, Illinois
 Prairie City Township, McDonough County, Illinois
 Prairie Creek Township, Logan County, Illinois
 Prairie du Long Township, St. Clair County, Illinois
 Prairie Green Township, Iroquois County, Illinois
 Prairieton Township, Christian County, Illinois
 Sand Prairie Township, Tazewell County, Illinois

See also

Prairie Township (disambiguation)

Illinois township disambiguation pages